The New York, New Haven and Hartford Railroad , commonly known as The Consolidated, or simply as the New Haven, was a railroad that operated in the New England region of the United States from 1872 to December 31, 1968. Founded by the merger of the New York and New Haven and Hartford and New Haven railroads, the company had near-total dominance of railroad traffic in Southern New England for the first half of the 20th century.

Beginning in the 1890s and accelerating in 1903, New York banker J. P. Morgan sought to monopolize New England transportation by arranging the NH's acquisition of 50 companies, including other railroads and steamship lines, and building a network of electrified trolley lines that provided interurban transportation for all of southern New England.

This quest for monopoly angered Progressive Era reformers, alienated public opinion, raised the cost of acquiring other companies and increased the railroad's construction costs. The company's debt soared from $14 million in 1903 to $242 million in 1913, while the advent of automobiles, trucks and buses reduced its profits. Also in 1913, the federal government filed an antitrust lawsuit that forced the NH to divest its trolley systems.

The line became bankrupt in 1935. It emerged from bankruptcy, albeit reduced in scope, in 1947, only to go bankrupt again in 1961. In 1969, its rail assets were merged with the Penn Central system, formed a year earlier by the merger of the New York Central Railroad and Pennsylvania Railroad. Already a poorly-conceived merger, Penn Central proceeded to go bankrupt in 1970, becoming the largest U.S. bankruptcy until the Enron Corporation superseded it in 2001. The remnants of the system now comprise Metro-North Railroad's New Haven Line, much of the northern leg of Amtrak's Northeast Corridor, Connecticut's Shore Line East and Hartford Line, parts of the MBTA, and numerous freight operators such as CSX and the Providence and Worcester Railroad. The majority of the system is now owned publicly by the states of Connecticut, Rhode Island, and Massachusetts.

History

Predecessors and formation (1839–1872) 

The New Haven system was formed by the merger of two railroads that intersected in New Haven, Connecticut: the Hartford and New Haven Railroad, which began service between New Haven and Springfield, Massachusetts, in 1839, and the New York and New Haven Railroad, which opened in 1848 between its namesake cities. The two companies had a history of cooperation; for a time, they jointly leased the New Haven and Northampton Railroad and coordinated their steamship services with each other.

An initial merger attempt between the two in 1870 was rejected by the Connecticut General Assembly, largely over fears that the merged railroad would form a monopoly. But the legislature approved a second attempt just two years later, and the New York, New Haven and Hartford Railroad was formed on July 24, 1872. The newly-combined railroad owned a main line from New York City to Springfield via New Haven and Hartford, Connecticut, and also reached New London, Connecticut via a lease of the Shore Line Railway (leased in 1870 by the New York and New Haven Railroad).

Expansion and acquisitions (1872–1900) 
The company later leased more lines and systems, eventually forming a virtual monopoly in New England south of the Boston and Albany Railroad. In 1882, the railroad leased the Boston, New York and Airline Railroad, the last railroad in New Haven not controlled by the NYNH&H. This new acquisition gave the New Haven Railroad a connection to Willimantic, Connecticut. Two more companies, the Naugatuck Railroad and the Connecticut Valley Railroad, were leased by the New Haven in 1887. With these two leases, the New Haven was in control of 10 of the 22 railroads in Connecticut at the time.

Early 20th century (1900–1935) 
Around the beginning of the 20th century, New York investors led by J. P. Morgan gained control, and in 1903 installed Charles S. Mellen as President. Charles Francis Murphy's New York Contracting and Trucking company was awarded a $6 million contract in 1904 to build rail lines in the Bronx for the New York, New Haven, and Hartford Railroad. An executive at the railroad said the contract was awarded to avoid friction with New York City’s Tammany Hall political machine. In response to this contract, the New York State Legislature amended the city's charter so that franchise-awarding power was removed from the city council and given to the Board of Estimate and Apportionment, which only became defunct in 1989. Morgan and Mellen achieved a complete monopoly of transportation in southern New England, purchasing other railroads and steamship and trolley lines. More than 100 independent railroads eventually became part of the system before and during these years, reaching 2,131 miles at its 1929 peak. Substantial improvements to the system were made during the Mellen years, including electrification between New York and New Haven. Morgan and Mellen went further and attempted to acquire or neutralize competition from other railroads in New England, including the New York Central's Boston and Albany Railroad, the Rutland Railroad, the Maine Central Railroad, and the Boston and Maine Railroad. But the Morgan-Mellen expansion left the company overextended and financially weak.

In 1914, 21 directors and ex-directors of the railroad were indicted for "conspiracy to monopolize interstate commerce by acquiring the control of practically all the transportation facilities of New England."

Financial difficulties (1935–1969) 

Under the stress of the Great Depression the company became bankrupt in 1935, remaining in trusteeship until 1947. Common stock was voided and creditors assumed control. During the 88 stations case, the railroad closed 88 stations in Massachusetts and 5 in Rhode Island in 1938, and unsuccessfully attempted to abandon the Boston-area portion of the Old Colony Division. The twelve-year reorganization resulted in "eight Supreme Court decisions, fourteen circuit court decisions, five district court decisions, and eleven ICC reports."

In 1948, the company operated 644 locomotives, 1,602 passenger cars and 8,796 freight cars on 1,581 miles of track. After 1951, both freight and passenger service lost money. The earlier expansion had left NH with a network of low-density branch lines that could not pay their own maintenance and operating costs. The freight business was short-haul, requiring switching costs that could not be recovered in short-distance rates. They operated major commuter train services in New York and Boston (as well as New Haven, Hartford and Providence), but these had always lost money; though heavily patronized, these services operated only during the morning and evening rush hours, and were unable to recover their infrastructure costs. The demise of the New Haven was likely hastened by the 1958 opening of the Connecticut Turnpike, largely paralleling the railroad’s mainline across the state, and the subsequent construction of other interstate highways. With decades of inadequate investment, the New Haven could not compete against automobiles or trucks.

In 1954, the brash Patrick B. McGinnis led a proxy fight against incumbent president Frederic C. "Buck" Dumaine Jr., vowing to return more of the company's profit to shareholders. McGinnis won control of the railroad and appointed Arthur V. McGowan, a longtime acquaintance, Vice President. McGinnis attempted to accomplish many of his financial goals by deferring all but the most essential maintenance. McGinnis also spent lavishly on a new visual identity for the company: green and gold trim was replaced by black, red-orange and white, accompanied by a stylized “NH” emblem. McGinnis and McGowan had Chrysler Imperial automobiles custom made so that they could travel along the railroad's tracks to their country estates in Litchfield County, Connecticut. When McGinnis departed 22 months later he left the company financially wrecked, a situation exacerbated by severe damage from the 1955 Connecticut floods.

In 1959, the New Haven discontinued passenger service on the Old Colony Railroad network in southeastern Massachusetts. Despite this and other cutbacks, the New Haven again declared bankruptcy on July 2, 1961.

Merger with Penn Central (1969–1976)

At the insistence of the Interstate Commerce Commission, the New Haven was merged into Penn Central on December 31, 1968, ending rail operations by the corporation. Penn Central was bankrupt by 1970 and the New Haven corporate entity remained in existence throughout the 1970s as the Trustee of the Estate pursued just payment from Penn Central for the New Haven's assets.

A substantial portion of the former New Haven main line between New York and Boston was transferred to Amtrak in 1976 and now forms the northern leg of the electrified Northeast Corridor, hosting high-speed Acela Express and regional rail service. The main line between New Rochelle and New Haven is jointly owned by the state of Connecticut and the Metropolitan Transportation Authority of New York, and is served by the Metro-North Railroad’s New Haven Line and Shore Line East, providing commuter service from Manhattan’s Grand Central Terminal as far eastward as New London, Connecticut. The New Haven Line is coded red on Metro-North timetables and system maps, a nod to the red livery used by the New Haven for the last decade of its history. MBTA's Providence/Stoughton Line provides commuter service between Providence and South Station in Boston.

Amtrak took over passenger service on the New Haven–Springfield Line in 1976, and was joined by the state of Connecticut's Hartford Line in 2018. 

On August 28, 1980, American Financial Enterprises, Inc., acquired the remaining assets of the New York, New Haven and Hartford Railroad Company when the plan for reorganization was approved by the court and the company was reorganized. This brought to an end the 108-year corporate history of the storied railroad, and the end to the 19-year saga of its second bankruptcy reorganization. American Financial Enterprises would become the largest single stockholder of Penn Central Company shares by the mid-1990s, controlling 32% of the stock of the company.

The Conrail era and beyond (1976–present)

Freight operations on former New Haven lines passed to Conrail with its government-overseen creation on April 1, 1976. During the subsequent 23 years, Conrail withdrew from much of that territory, abandoning some track and handing other lines over to the Providence & Worcester, Bay Colony, Boston & Maine, Connecticut Central, Pioneer Valley, Housatonic and Connecticut Southern railroads. Those lines still operated by Conrail in 1999 became part of CSX Transportation as the result of the breakup of the Conrail system.

The state of Connecticut frequently alludes to the New Haven in its modern transportation projects; much of the state’s commuter equipment is painted in McGinnis-era livery, while the iconic "NH" logo appears on everything from rolling stock, station signage, to tourism materials for the city of New Haven itself.

The Connecticut Department of Transportation has painted its diesel commuter rail locomotives used on the non-electrified Danbury and Waterbury Metro-North branches, as well as its Shore Line East operation, in the "McGinnis Scheme," composed of white, black, and orange-red stripes with the iconic NH logo. Although a new livery was introduced with the opening of the Hartford Line commuter service in 2018, much of its equipment is shared with Shore Line East, of which some continue to bear the McGinnis livery and the rest have been repainted into the new "CTrail" livery. All of these lines were formerly owned by the New Haven.

The Valley Railroad, a preservation line based in Essex, Connecticut that runs both steam and diesel traction, has painted the authentic script-lettering insignia of the original "New York, New Haven and Hartford" railroad on the tenders of its resident steam locomotives, 2-8-0 Consolidation type Number 97 and 2-8-2 Mikado type number 40. There is a third steam locomotive in restoration to running order; a Chinese SY-class Mikado, formerly known as the 1658, it is being renumbered and painted as New Haven 3025, and is to be based on a Mikado-type engine that was typical to the New Haven.

In 2016, the New Britain Rock Cats relocated a few miles to Hartford to become the Hartford Yard Goats. The name reflects the old New York, New Haven and Hartford railroad history and the logo is based on the original NYNHH logo. The team began playing in 2017 in downtown Hartford at Dunkin Donuts Park.

Operations

Passenger
 Passenger trains ran between Grand Central Terminal and Boston's South Station via Providence, Springfield or Willimantic.
 Several passenger trains a day, including the overnight Federal,  ran between Washington, D.C. and New York (Penn Station) via PRR and on to Boston.
 Passenger service operated from Grand Central Terminal to Hartford, Springfield and beyond.
 The premier New York–Boston passenger service was the Merchants Limited, leaving Grand Central and South Station simultaneously at 5 PM. Also prominent was the Yankee Clipper, with 1 PM departures. For many years these trains carried no coaches, only parlor cars, dining and lounge cars.

NH introduced ideas for passenger rail travel, including early use of restaurant and parlor cars in the steam era, and more during the transition to diesel. NH was a pioneer in many ways; in streamliners with the Comet, in the use of diesel multiple units (DMUs) in the U.S. with both Budd's regular Budd Rail Diesel Cars (RDCs) and the all-RDC Roger Williams trainset, in the use of rail-adapted buses, in lightweight trains such as the Train X-equipped Dan'l Webster, and in experimentation with Talgo-type (passive tilt) equipment on the train John Quincy Adams.

An audacious experiment was the UAC TurboTrain, which with passive tilt, turbine engines and light weight attempted to revolutionize medium—distance railway travel in the U.S. Sponsored by the U.S. Department of Transportation, the Turbo Train holds the U.S. railway speed record of 170 mph, set in 1968. The NH never operated the Turbo in revenue service, as the NH was purchased by PC, which operated the train.

Other passenger trains:

 Ambassador (New York-Montreal)
Bankers (New York–Springfield)
Bar Harbor Express (Washington, D.C.-Ellsworth, Maine) (overnight; all-Pullman) (summer only)
Bay State (New York–Boston)
Berkshire (New York–Danbury–Pittsfield)
Bostonian (New York–Boston)
Buttermilk Bay (Boston-Hyannis, and -Woods Hole)
Colonial (Washington–Boston)
Commander (New York–Boston)
Connecticut Yankee (New York-Quebec City) via Boston & Maine (B&M), Quebec Central Railway
Cranberry (Boston-Hyannis, and -Woods Hole)
Dan'l Webster (New York–Boston)
Day Cape Codder (New York–Hyannis/Woods Hole) (summer only)
Day White Mountains (New York–Berlin, New Hampshire via B&M)
East Wind (Washington, D.C.–Portland, Maine, via PRR and B&M) (summer only)
Federal (Washington, D.C.–Boston) (overnight)
Forty–Second Street (New York–Boston)
Gilt Edge (New York–Boston) 
Hell Gate Express (New York (Penn Station)–Boston)
Housatonic (New York–Danbury–Pittsfield)
Litchfield (New York–Danbury–Pittsfield)
Mayflower (New York–Boston)
Merchants Limited (New York–Boston)
Montrealer (Washington, D.C.–Montreal, via PRR, Canadian National (CN), Central Vermont Railway (CV), and B&M) (overnight)
Murray Hill (New York–Boston)
Narragansett (New York–Boston) (overnight)
Nathan Hale (New York–White River Junction) (overnight)
Naugatuck (New York–Winsted, Connecticut)
Neptune (New York–Hyannis/Woods Hole) (summer only)
New Yorker (New York–Boston)
Night Cape Codder (New York–Hyannis/Woods Hole) (overnight, summer only)
Night White Mountains (Washington, D.C.-Bretton Woods) (overnight, summer only)
North Wind (New York-Bretton Woods) (summer only)
Nutmeg (Boston-Franklin-Hartford-Waterbury)
Owl (New York–Boston) (overnight)
Patriot (Washington, D.C.–Boston)
Pilgrim (Philadelphia–Boston) (overnight)
Puritan (New York–Boston)
Quaker (Philadelphia–Boston) (overnight)
Sand Dune (Boston-Hyannis, and -Woods Hole)
Senator (Washington, D.C.–Boston)
Shoreliner (New York–Boston)
State of Maine (New York–Portland/Bangor via B&M and Maine Central Railroad or MEC) (overnight)
Valley Express (New York-White River Junction)
Washingtonian (Montreal–Washington, D.C., via PRR, CN, CV and B&M) (overnight)
William Penn (Philadelphia–Boston) (overnight)
Yankee Clipper (New York–Boston)

Commuter
 Commuter service from New York ran through New Rochelle to Stamford, New Canaan, Danbury (and on to Pittsfield), and through Bridgeport to New Haven and Waterbury (and on to Hartford and Winsted).
Commuter service from Boston went to destinations on the OC system of Greenbush, Plymouth, Brockton/Campello, Middleboro, Hyannis/Woods Hole on Cape Cod, Fall River, Newport, New Bedford and Providence, Woonsocket, Needham Heights, West Medway and Dedham.

Yale Bowl trains
Beginning November 21, 1914, the railroad operated special trains to bring football fans to and from the new Yale Bowl stadium in New Haven. Passengers rode extra trains from Springfield, Boston, and especially New York to the New Haven Union Station, where they transferred to trolleys for the  ride to the Bowl. On November 21, 1922, for example, such trains carried more than 50,000 passengers. "There is nothing which can be compared with the New Haven's football movement except a record of one of the mass-movements incidental to the European war," one observer wrote in 1916.

Freight

 Major freight yards were at South Boston, Taunton, Fall River, New Bedford, Providence (Northup Avenue Yard), Worcester, Springfield, Hartford, Waterbury, New Haven (the major Cedar Hill hump classification yard), Maybrook (another hump yard and interchange point for western connections), New York Harlem River and New York Bay Ridge (where interchange was made with the PRR and other railroads in New Jersey, via barge (car float)).
 Multiple through freight trains traveled at night between New York or Maybrook and Cedar Hill yard and on to Boston. Other through freights served the yards above as well as intermediate points and also State Line (New York Central interchange), Brockton, Framingham and Lowell (B&M interchange for traffic for Taunton, New Bedford and Fall River).

Company officers

See also

 EMD FL9 – a dual-power electro-diesel locomotive
 EP-5 electric locomotive
 FM P-12-42 – a streamlined locomotive
 Joy Steamship Company
 List of New York, New Haven and Hartford Railroad precursors

References

Further reading
 
 
  Covers the railroad's history from 1951 to 1995.
  Details the company's passenger boats

External links

New Haven Railroad Historical and Technical Association
New York New Haven And Hartford Railroad Company Stations (complete listing by branch)
Historic American Engineering Record (HAER) documentation:

University Railroad Collection: New York, New Haven, and Hartford Railroad at Thomas J. Dodd Research Center, University of Connecticut Library 
New York, New Haven, and Hartford Railroad Company records at Baker Library Special Collections, Harvard Business School.

 
Defunct Connecticut railroads
Defunct Massachusetts railroads
Defunct New York (state) railroads
Defunct Rhode Island railroads
Former Class I railroads in the United States
Predecessors of Conrail
Railway companies established in 1872
Railway companies disestablished in 1968
Standard gauge railways in the United States
1968 disestablishments in Connecticut
1872 establishments in Connecticut